DPAC may refer to:

Organisations

Government
Australia:
Department of Premier and Cabinet (New South Wales)
Department of the Premier and Cabinet (Queensland)
Department of Premier and Cabinet, Victoria
Department of Premier and Cabinet (Western Australia)
Albania:
Civil Aviation Authority (Albania) (formerly Drejtoria e Pergjithshme e Aviacionit Civil)

Other organisations
The Data Processing and Analysis Consortium for the ESA's Gaia space telescope
Disabled People Against Cuts, UK anti-austerity campaign group

Places
United States:
Denver Performing Arts Complex, Colorado
Durham Performing Arts Center, North Carolina